Sir Alfred Joseph Karney Young  (1 August 1864 – 5 January 1942) was a British barrister and judge. He held a number of political and judicial offices, including Attorney General of British East Africa, Chief Justice of the Seychelles, Attorney General of Fiji, Chief Justice of the Leeward Islands, Chief Justice of Fiji, and Chief Judicial Commissioner for the Western Pacific.

Early life and family
Alfred Young was born in Victoria, Colony of British Columbia (now British Columbia, Canada), where his father, William Alexander George Young (c1827-1885) (later Sir William Young, CMG), was Colonial Secretary and also acting Colonial Secretary of Vancouver Island. See also below. His mother was Cecilia Eliza Cowan Cameron. See also below.

Alfred Young was the youngest of three children. His brother was Sir William Douglas Young (1859–1943), Governor of the Falkland Islands from 1915 to 1920. His sister was Mary Alice Young (b. 1862), who married Frederick Mitchell Hodgson, later Governor of Gold Coast like her father.

He was educated in England at St. Mark's School, Windsor  (later Imperial Service College) until 1884, and graduated from Magdalen College, Oxford in 1887.

Legal career
He was called to the Bar at the Inner Temple, 15 May 1889. His colonial legal career began with an appointment (possibly as Crown Prosecutor) in the British administration of British Honduras (now Belize), where he compiled a list of the colony's laws, and made a report on the 1901 Census.

Young was appointed Crown Prosecutor in the Seychelles in 1903, where he made the decennial revision of the current list of laws of the Seychelles. He served as Attorney General of the British Central Africa Protectorate from May 1906  and Stipendiary Magistrate in Trinidad before being appointed Chief Justice of the Seychelles in 1909.

In June? 1914 (just before the outbreak of World War I) he was appointed Attorney General of Fiji, which included his being made an Official Member of the Legislative Council of Fiji.

He was in Sydney in June 1920, the guest at a rugby match of the Governor of New South Wales, Sir Walter Davidson. Davidson had been Governor of the Seychelles when Young was Crown Prosecutor and Attorney General there. In November 1920 Young was appointed Chief Justice of the Leeward Islands, and in 1921 as a member of the Fijian Legislative Council. He was appointed Chief Justice of Fiji and Chief Judicial Commissioner for the Western Pacific in December 1922, and received a knighthood the following year. He was in Sydney again in April 1927.

1928 Royal Commission
In 1928 Young headed a Royal Commission to investigate whether the swimming baths in the capital, Suva, operated a 'Europeans-only' policy.

Since 1879 the colony of Fiji had imported indentured workers (as cheap labour) from India to work in the European-owned plantations, which produced (according to demand) sea island cotton from the late 1860s to the early 1870s, then copra, then sugarcane from around 1880. This Indian immigration (which ended in 1916) came about because the Pacific Islands (particularly the New Hebrides and the Solomon Islands) couldn't provide enough labour. These islands provided labour from 1864 to 1911, when the European planters in the Solomon Islands and the New Hebrides brought about legislation to prevent emigration from those islands.

The involvement of the Indian Army and India generally during the First World War had convinced the colonial Indian Government of the necessity of enfranchising all Indian citizens, and this was granted in 1917. This move towards "responsible government" included Indians living in Fiji, which replicated in some degree the political motivation and agitation which within India pushed towards the Dominion status enjoyed by Canada, Australia, New Zealand and South Africa.

Moves towards independence continued to gather pace during Young's time as Chief Justice in Fiji, where many time-served previously indentured labourers from India had stayed on to live permanently. In 1928, Indian Fijians began to complain about low numbers of enfranchised rate-payers in Suva, and about a perceived 'Europeans-only' policy of segregation in the two municipally-run public Suva swimming baths . The Governor, Sir Eyre Hutson appointed a Committee to investigate the municipal matter. The committee split into three factions which each produced a report on the situation. The disagreement between the three groups led to the Governor appointing Young to head a Royal Commission: he found that there had been a policy of segregation, which was brought to an end.

Cricketing career
Alfred Young played cricket twice for Kent County Cricket Club, once in 1887 and again in 1890. The latter match, against MCC at Lord's, was his only first-class cricket appearance. He also played for Rochester Cricket Club. According to his Wisden obituary, he was "a sound, steady batsman, showing special skill in placing the ball off his legs and late cutting".

Young was an early pioneer of cricket in British Honduras, his first posting in the judiciary of the British colonial administration.

Later life and death
He retired in 1929, and married Frances May Buckley (née Miller) (1875–4 October 1952) on 19 April 1930. Her parents were Sir Henry Miller (9 September 1830 – 7 February 1917) and Jessie Orbell (d. 23 July 1920). Frances was the widow (married 14 June 1899) of St. John McLean Buckley, a wealthy New Zealand sheep rancher who died in 1916. See below.

Young was later appointed a Resident Magistrate in Cape Town, South Africa, and died there in Tamboerskloof on 5 January 1942, aged 76.
A brief notice of his death appeared in the New Zealand Herald.

Selected publications
 
  (The Angelus was a Belize newspaper.)
  [F. A. Herchenroder was the first Chief Justice of the Seychelles.]

Family tree

William Douglas Young
Sir Alfred Young's brother.

Sir William Douglas Young KBE, CMG, (27 Jan 1859–1943), was a colonial administrator from British Columbia who was Governor of the Falkland Islands from 1915 to 1920.

W. A. G. Young
Sir Alfred Young's father.

William Alexander George Young (c1827- 25 April 1885), was a Royal Navy officer and colonial administrator who served as Governor of Gold Coast from 1884 until his death in 1885. He was created a Companion of the Order of Saint Michael and Saint George (CMG) at the time of his appointment as Governor.

Cecilia E. C. Cameron
Sir Alfred Young's mother.

Cecilia Eliza Cowan Cameron (b. c1832 in Georgetown, British Guiana), was the  daughter of a free coloured Creole, Cecilia Eliza Douglas (1812 – November 1859) and an itinerant sea captain named Cowan who left British Guiana for America. Although she went to the States to join (or search for) him, Cecilia Douglas (Young's grandmother) never found the errant sailor.

On her return to British Guiana Cecilia Douglas met and married secondly (on 4 June 1838 in Georgetown) David Cameron (1804–1872), a Scotsman from Perth who at the time was employed on a plantation (quite possibly owned by her father's Glasgow trading firm J. T. & A. Douglas and Company) in Demerara. David Cameron brought his new family back to Britain in 1845, and Cecilia Douglas (now Cameron) arranged for her daughter Cecilia Cowan Cameron (Alfred Young's mother) to Cologne aged around 13–14 for her education.

Her uncle was the nepotistic James Douglas, the Governor of Colony of Vancouver Island or Vancouver Island who had arrived at what became Fort Victoria in 1843 on the Beaver. Douglas was also Chief Factor of the Hudson's Bay Company, (and later the Governor of British Columbia after its formation in 1859) and came from a tight-knit, exclusive circle of inter-related élite business families in Glasgow. He ran British Columbia and Vancouver Island as a family company, and "the interests of all...seemed hopelessly sacrificed to the company's absolute sway" (p. 271)

He paid for Cecilia Cowan to travel to Vancouver Island, and in November 1850 she began the long passage around Cape Horn aboard the Tory, to Fort Victoria, British Columbia.

Most likely at Douglas' instigation, in 1853 the governor of the Hudson's Bay Company (HBC), Andrew Colvile, offered Cameron (her step-father) the position of superintendent of the company's coal mining development at Nanaimo, Vancouver Island. Cameron accepted and arrived with his wife in July 1853 to join their daughter. Shortly after arriving in Vancouver Island in 1853, Cameron was appointed as a judge on the newly created Court of Common Pleas established by the Legislative Council of Vancouver Island. His salary of £100 was to be paid from duties on licensed ale-houses. Cameron's appointment was controversial, with opponents of the "family-company compact" noting that not only was he an HBC employee, as were most council members, but he had family ties to Douglas, and had no legal training, either.

Cecilia Eliza Cowan Cameron married Assistant Paymaster William A. G. Young, RN, (later Sir William Young) on 20 March 1858.; Young was soon to be appointed Colonial Secretary of British Columbia, and was later Governor of Gold Coast. He had arrived in BC as Commissioner's secretary on the joint Anglo-American Boundary Commission for New Caledonia, which – thanks to the Fraser Canyon Gold Rush – shortly became British Columbia, where he became Colonial Secretary.

They had three children:   
Sir William Douglas Young (c1859-1943), Governor of the Falkland Islands from 1915 to 1920
Mary Alice Young (b. 1862), m. Frederick Mitchell Hodgson, later Governor of Gold Coast and Governor of British Guiana. She was a Lady of Grace of the Order of Saint John of Jerusalem, and in 1901 published a volume entitled The Siege of Kumassi, which described her experiences in Kumasi with Hodgson in that critical episode in the Ashanti War of 1900.
 Sir Alfred Karney Young (1 August 1864 – 5 January 1942), Chief Justice of Fiji and Chief Judicial Commissioner for the Western Pacific.

Cecilia Cowan Cameron's parents
Sir Alfred Young's great-grandparents:

Cecilia Eliza Douglas (1812 – Nov. 1859?) was the youngest of three known illegitimate children born to John (II) Douglas (1772–1840) and Martha Ann Ritchie (later? Telfer) (c. 1780s-July 1839). She married David Cameron (1804–1872), first Chief Justice of Vancouver Island.

Cecilia Douglas' father, John (II) Douglas, was in partnership with two of his brothers, Thomas and Archibald, as J. T. & A. Douglas and Company, with cotton and sugar interests in Demerara and Berbice? or Esquisse?. Their father, John (I) Douglas, had married Cecilia Buchanan, whose family owned tobacco plantations in Virginia, USA.

John (II) Douglas looked after his firm's sugar plantations in Demerara, where he cohabited with Martha Ann Telfer (née Ritchie) (c1780s-July 1839), Cecilia Cowan Cameron's grandmother. She was a free coloured Creole born in Barbados, living in New Amsterdam, Berbice or Georgetown, Demerara, later British Guiana, now Guyana. Martha Ritchie married at some point one Richard? Telfer: her will was in the name of Mrs. M. A. Telfer.

Some twelve years before Cecilia they had two sons (Alfred Young's great-uncles) in Demerara; they were Alexander (b. c1801-2) and James Douglas (b. Demerara 1803). They grew up in Georgetown with their mother, Martha, while John Douglas returned to Scotland and married Jessie (or Janet) Hamilton of Greenock in 1809. However, he continued to consort with Martha Ritchie on another trip (by 1811) to Demerara; their daughter Cecilia Eliza Douglas (1812-Nov. 1859) (Cecilia Cowan's mother), was born in Georgetown in 1812. Douglas took his two sons (aged about 10 and 11) back to Scotland (probably by summer 1812), where they were educated in Lanark.

Like her brothers before her, Cecilia Eliza Douglas grew up in Demerara with her mother Martha Ritchie (who at some point married Richard? Telfer in Georgetown), and her grandmother, Rebecca Ritchie. Rebecca was a free coloured or mulatto Creole woman born in Barbados, who moved to New Amsterdam, Demerara with her daughter Martha in the late 1790s and owned 30 slaves. When Martha Telfer died in July 1839 she left some of her estate to her granddaughter (Alfred Young's mother), Cecilia Eliza Cowan.

Edith Rebecca Cameron

Alfred Young's maternal aunt

Cecilia Eliza Douglas and David Cameron had one daughter, Edith Rebecca Cameron (Cecilia Cowan Cameron's half-sister). She married in 1860 Henry Montagu Doughty of Theberton Hall, Saxmundham, Suffolk. His brother was Charles Montagu Doughty, author of Travels in Arabia Deserta. Their parents were Rev. Charles Montagu Doughty of Theberton and Louisa Hotham, whose grandfather was the second son of Beaumont Hotham, 2nd Baron Hotham, 12th Baronet and Baron of the Exchequer for 30 years.

Edith Cameron and her husband Henry Doughty (RN) had two sons (Young's cousins). The eldest was Lt-Colonel Charles Hotham Montagu Doughty, VC, (1868–1915), a soldier and military vice-consul in Turkey. He served and fought in Europe, Africa and China, changing his name to Doughty-Wylie to incorporate his wife's maiden name. He was killed at Gallipoli on 25 April 1915 having landing at V Beach from the SS River Clyde. He rallied the troops on the beach to attack Hill 141, its dominant feature, but was killed at the moment of victory. His younger brother was Rear-Admiral Sir Henry Doughty RN (1870–1921), who commanded  at the Battle of Jutland in 1916, 

St. John McLean Buckley
Sir Alfred Young's wife, Frances May Buckley (née Miller) (1875–4 October 1952), was the widow of St. John McLean Buckley, a New Zealand sheep farmer.

Buckley was the nephew and heir of Jock McLean, who originally travelled with his brother Allan from the island of Coll, Scotland, to Victoria, Australia, Australia as shepherds, then to Otago in 1852 and sold stuff to gold miners.

A few months after John Turnbull Thomson had surveyed the area, the pastoralist Jock McLean, looking for sheep range, would follow Thomson's directions into the district, stand on Grandview Peak as had the surveyor, and sketch out the boundaries of the massive sheep station of the Morven Hills.

He took up grazing rights (i.e. appropriated) on a huge area of tussock grasslands in the centre of the South Island which he named "Morven Hills". The area is between the plains of the McKenzie basin and the rugged country of Central Otago. There was a short period of gold mining activity about 1862 but since then the principal activity has been pastoral farming, mainly with Merino sheep.

John Polson (born 5 December 1836 at Marrel, Morven Hills nr Helmsdale), a cooper, left Scotland in 1861 or 1862, travelling to New Zealand on the Canterbury and arriving at the Port of Lyttelton in 1862. He journeyed on to Port Chalmers, Otago, in the same year. On his arrival he found a mob of sheep whose shepherd had taken ill. The flock of sheep was consigned to Morven Hills in the Lindis Pass region of Central Otago. Although totally inexperienced in shepherding he agreed to conduct the flock to its destination Morven Hills, a hundred and fifty miles away. He had little idea where the Morven Hills Station was situated and taking the chance he set out with the flock of sheep. There was little in the way of roads in 1862, so by walking across brown tussock covered hills and bare mountains and ridges, and by driving the flock across swiftly flowing rivers he reached the Lindis. When he arrived with the sheep, the owner of Morven Hills, Jock McLean, employed him, and John decided to make his future home here.

In 1910, the Morven Hills estate was split up for settlers and the three blocks of Breast Hill, Forest Range and Bargour were created for purchase. McLean died in 1902 leaving £213,000.

Picture of Redcastle, the mansion built on the McLean estate (now St. Kevin's College), north of Oamaru, by Jock McLean's heir and nephew, St. John McLean Buckley.

Lyttelton, New Zealand, 8 January 1910: Stuart Walls (a former employee of Bank of New Zealand) was charged with having forged and uttered a cheque for £100, purporting to have been signed by St. John McLean Buckley. Remanded to appear Oamaru on Monday
He was found guilty and sentenced to 3 months' imprisonment.

The estate of the late Mr. St. John McLean Buckley, of Otago (N.Z.), has been assessed for stamp duty at £138,770 (or £158,770 or £166,884 according to other sources) Buried in old Oamaru cemetery

St. John Buckley was President of Oamaru Caledonian Society.

ReferencesNotesCitationsSources'''

  (D.Phil. dissertation)

 
 
 
 

 
 
   
 

 
 

External links
 History of the Seychelles in 1909 at the Seychelles Nation''

|-

Attorneys General of the Colony of Fiji
Attorneys-general of Fiji
People from Victoria, British Columbia
Alumni of Magdalen College, Oxford
1864 births
1942 deaths
Colony of Fiji judges
Ethnic minority members of the Legislative Council of Fiji
Chief justices of Fiji
Chief judicial commissioners for the Western Pacific
Attorneys General of the East Africa Protectorate
Chief justices of Seychelles
British Seychelles judges
Chief justices of the Leeward Islands
British Honduras people
South African judges
British Trinidad and Tobago judges
Knights Bachelor